Ellen Weaver (born 1979/1980) is a Republican politician who has served as South Carolina's South Carolina Superintendent of Education since January 11, 2023. She defeated Democrat Lisa Ellis in the general election in November 2022. She is the president and CEO of the Palmetto Promise Institute, a conservative think tank in South Carolina.

Personal life

Weaver graduated from Bob Jones University in Greenville, South Carolina. She worked for Senator Jim DeMint. Weaver, along with Senator DeMint, founded the Palmetto Promise Institute, a conservative think tank. Weaver serves as the president of the institution. Weaver serves as a non-elected member of the Education Oversight Committee for the South Carolina General Assembly. Weaver serves as the founder and chief executive officer of Palmetto Promise Institute.

Political career

Weaver was appointed to the South Carolina Education Oversight Committee in 2018, becoming the chair of the organization in February 2019. She held the position for two years until her resignation in 2021, though she remains on the board. She succeeded Neil Robinson in 2019, who succeeded her in 2021.

In 2022, Weaver declared her candidacy for South Carolina's superintendent of education, to succeed Republican Molly Spearman, who did not seek a third term. Her endorsements included Senator Tim Scott, former U.S. ambassador of the United Nations and former South Carolina governor, Nikki Haley former Senator Jim DeMint, and former U.S. Secretary of Education Mick Zais. When it was discovered that Weaver does not hold a master's degree, a requirement to serve as state superintendent of education, Weaver announced she would have the degree by October 2022. She received a master's degree in Educational Leadership from the Christian affiliated Bob Jones University. The degree does not confer eligibility to attain a teaching certification. Multiple media outlets had focused on her lack of a masters degree, a requirement for taking office under South Carolina law, but Weaver completed the degree in eight months prior to her innaguration. The university faced scrutiny from its accreditor, Southern Association of Colleges and Schools, in regard to a fast-tracking her master's degree. Upon her inauguration, the South Carolina Democratic Party requested that the attorney general investigate Weaver's earning of a master's in such a short period.

In contrast to her runoff and general election opponents, who have received mostly small single-donor contributions, Weaver has received large contributions, including from out-of-state pro-school choice supporters. Her campaign received support in the form of $750,000 in attack ads paid for by Pennsylvania billionaire Jeff Yass' Super PAC, School Freedom Fund. The ads boosted Weaver's claims that Maness was a "liberal" by using out-of-context clips of Democrats introducing Maness at conferences.

During the primary runoff campaign, Weaver accused her challenger, Kathy Maness, of not being conservative enough to serve as an elected Republican. Weaver said, "we have a clear choice between a proven America-first conservative and my opponent, whose face could be on Wikipedia next to Republican in Name Only." Maness reacted by arguing that Weaver lacked appropriate credentials to serve as superintendent of education.

In the Republican primary, Kathy Maness placed first with 31% of the vote. Weaver was in second place with 23% of the vote. Because no candidate received 50% of the vote, a runoff election was held two weeks later. Weaver defeated Maness in the Republican primary runoff on June 28, 2022.

In the general election, she defeated Democrat Lisa Ellis. She became the 18th South Carolina superintendent of education on January 11, 2023.

Beliefs

She has argued that the teaching of critical race theory is a major threat to South Carolina's school system, citing it as "woke Washington ideology." According to the South Carolina Department of Education and school district officials, critical race theory is not systematically taught or funded in SC public schools, and has not been taught in the past. But Weaver maintains that critical race theory is taught in South Carolina schools after hearing complaints from teachers and parents. In the 2022 debate for state superintendent of education, Weaver stated that she rejects the "woke ideology" of Kimberlé Crenshaw and Ibram X. Kendi.

During her campaign, Weaver argued that parents, not teachers, maintain the right to guide their children through mental, physical, and health-related decisions. Weaver is a strong advocate of school choice and supports providing education scholarship accounts (see school voucher) to subsidize private or charter school tuition. In a high-profile example of Weaver's support for public funding subsidizing private school tuition, the South Carolina Supreme Court determined that South Carolina Governor Henry McMaster's SAFE Grants, which were promoted publicly by Weaver and the Palmetto Promise Institute, were a violation of the state constitution's prohibition against state funds being used to fund private schools.

Electoral history

Notes

References

External links
 Campaign website

21st-century American businesswomen
21st-century American businesspeople
21st-century American politicians
American chief executives
Bob Jones University alumni
Living people
South Carolina Superintendent of Education
Year of birth missing (living people)